Aalborg Airport  is a dual-use (civilian/military) airport located in Nørresundby, Aalborg Municipality, Denmark, which is  northwest of Aalborg.

Facilities

Airlines and destinations

The following airlines operate regular scheduled and charter flights at the airport:

Other facilities
North Flying has its head office in the North Flying Terminal at Aalborg Airport. Greenland Express had its headquarters at the airport as well.

History
Aalborg Airport was opened in 1938 as the second national airport.

During World War II, Aalborg was occupied and used by the German Air Force.  The 3rd and 5th squadrons of Bordfliegergruppe 196 (Embarked Air Group 196) as well as the group's staff unit, used Aalborg as a base for maritime reconnaissance flights and detachments serving aboard German Navy surface combatants.

The present terminal building is from 2001. The airport was enlarged during 2007 and 2013, increasing the terminal size and number of gates.

Statistics

Ground transport

Train
The airport is served by Aalborg Airport railway station on the Aalborg Airport railway line. The trains go to Copenhagen Central Station with stop at three places inside Aalborg and at several cities along the route. The station started operation on 13 December 2020.

Bus
City buses also go from the airport.

See also
 List of the largest airports in the Nordic countries

References

External links

 Aalborg Airport official site: Danish or English
 AIP Denmark: Aalborg – EKYT
 VFR Flight Guide Denmark: Aalborg – EKYT
 Aalborg Airport Project details

Airports in Denmark
Transport in Aalborg
Buildings and structures in Aalborg
International airports in Denmark